

References

See also
List of protected areas in Kazakhstan

National parks
Kazakhstan
 
National parks